Delta Historic District is a national historic district located at Delta in York County, Pennsylvania. The district includes 137 collective buildings, mostly constructed between 1875 and 1895. The buildings are primarily frame and clapboard structures set upon a slate foundation and topped with slate shingle roof. They are reflective of a number of popular architectural styles including the Greek Revival and Late Victorian style. The use of slate reflects the prominence of that industry on the local economy.

It was listed on the National Register of Historic Places in 1983.

References 

Historic districts on the National Register of Historic Places in Pennsylvania
Historic districts in York County, Pennsylvania
Articles containing video clips
National Register of Historic Places in York County, Pennsylvania